The discography of Kansas, an American rock band, consists of 16 studio albums, seven live albums, nine compilation albums, and 29 singles. Formed by members Kerry Livgren, Robby Steinhardt, Dave Hope, Phil Ehart, Steve Walsh, and Rich Williams, the group signed a recording contract with Kirshner Records in 1974. That same year they released their self-titled debut album.

After the release of two albums in 1975, including Masque (which sold half a million copies in the United States), the group released Leftoverture in October 1976. The album peaked at No. 5 on the Billboard 200 and spawned the single "Carry On Wayward Son", which reached No. 11 on the Billboard Hot 100, leading the album to sell over five million copies in the United States. The following year, their fifth album Point of Know Return was issued and certified four-times platinum by the Recording Industry Association of America; it spawned the Top 10 single "Dust in the Wind". After the release of a live album, the group sixth studio release Monolith was issued in 1979, which spawned two singles. Audio-Visions was released in 1980 and certified gold by the Recording Industry Association of America. Their eighth studio album Vinyl Confessions contained the single "Play the Game Tonight", which became their first Top 20 single on the Billboard Hot 100 in four years; however, the album itself did not sell well. Eventually, after the release of a ninth studio album in 1983, the group disbanded.

Kansas reformed again in 1985 and released the studio album Power in 1986 on MCA Records, whose single "All I Wanted" reached No. 19 on the Billboard Hot 100 that year. After the release of another album in 1988, the group reunited seven years later for the Freaks of Nature album (1995) on Intersound Records. In 1998, Always Never the Same was released on River North Records, followed by Somewhere to Elsewhere in 2000 on Magna Carta Records. Lineup changes in 2014 motivated a return to the studio which led to the release of The Prelude Implicit in 2016 and The Absence of Presence in 2020.

According to the Recording Industry Association of America, Kansas have sold 15.5 million records.

Albums

Studio albums

Live albums

Compilation albums

Singles

Other album appearances

References

External links
 
 

Discographies of American artists
Rock music group discographies
Discography